Rigatoni are a form of tube-shaped pasta of varying lengths and diameters originating in Italy. They are larger than penne and ziti, and sometimes slightly curved. They are not as curved as elbow macaroni. Rigatoni characteristically have ridges down their length, sometimes spiraling around the tube, and unlike penne, rigatoni's ends are cut square (perpendicular) to the tube walls instead of diagonally.

The word rigatoni comes from the Italian word rigato (rigatone being the augmentative and rigatoni the plural form), which means "ridged" or "lined", and is associated with the cuisine of southern and central Italy. Rigatoncini are a smaller version, close to the size of penne. Their name takes on the diminutive suffix -ino (pluralized -ini) denoting their relative size.

Rigatoni is a particular favorite pasta shape in the south of Italy, especially in Sicily. Its eponymous ridges make better adhesive surfaces for sauces and grated cheese than smooth-sided pasta like ziti.

See also
 List of pasta
 List of Italian dishes

References

Cuisine of Lazio
Types of pasta